Mario Enrique del Toro (born 18 August 1966) is a Mexican politician affiliated with the Party of the Democratic Revolution. As of 2014 he served as Deputy of the LX Legislature of the Mexican Congress representing the State of Mexico.

References

1966 births
Living people
Politicians from Michoacán
People from Apatzingán
Party of the Democratic Revolution politicians
21st-century Mexican politicians
Deputies of the LX Legislature of Mexico
Members of the Chamber of Deputies (Mexico) for the State of Mexico